Senator Swope may refer to:

Chandler Swope (born 1942), West Virginia State Senate
Samuel F. Swope (1809–1865), Kentucky State Senate